The Sanpete County Courthouse, at 160 N. Main St. in Manti, Utah, was built in 1935.  It was listed on the National Register of Historic Places in 1985.

It was built of oolite limestone in PWA Moderne style.  It has a two-story central block with vertical window panels and two two-story wings with horizontal window panels.

It was asserted to be "one of the best examples of the distinctive PWA Moderne architectural
style in Utah."

References

Courthouses in Utah
PWA Moderne architecture in Utah
National Register of Historic Places in Sanpete County, Utah
Buildings and structures completed in 1935